The following events occurred in September 1926:

Wednesday, September 1, 1926
In Spain, 100 were killed in flooding from storms that followed a fifty-five-day drought.
The standoff continued in Wanhsien as the gunboat Widgeon arrived carrying the British Consul from Chongqing in response to 's call of the previous day.

Thursday, September 2, 1926

The funeral train of Rudolph Valentino left New York on a cross-country journey to his final resting place in California.
The Italian government and the Imam of Yemen signed a Treaty of Friendship.
Some 20,000 Chinese troops under General Yang Sen assembled with artillery along the shoreline of Wanhsien.
Born: Ibrahim Nasir, Prime Minister of the Maldives (d. 2008)

Friday, September 3, 1926
The Funkturm Berlin radio tower was inaugurated on the occasion of the 3. Große Deutsche Funkausstellung (3rd Great German Radio Exhibition).
Rudolph Valentino's funeral train pulled into LaSalle Street Station in Chicago. A heavy police presence was on hand to keep order, but some grieving fans got past the police cordon and ran out onto the tracks. Only a few invitees were allowed into the train. 
The Canberra Times newspaper was first published in Australia.
Born: Uttam Kumar, actor, filmmaker and musician, in Calcutta, British Raj (d. 1980)

Saturday, September 4, 1926
The council body unanimously accepted a resolution to admit Germany to the League with a permanent seat. Spain turned down a semi-permanent council seat at the League of Nations; it wanted a permanent one.
Born:
Yevgeni Nikolayevich Andreyev, Soviet Air Force colonel and balloonist; in Novosibirsk, Russia (d. 2000)
Bert Olmstead, hockey player; in Sceptre, Saskatchewan, Canada (d. 2015)

Sunday, September 5, 1926
A camouflaged and armored merchant ship SS Kiawo sailed into Wanhsien bearing a naval crew and attempted to board the Chinese-occupied merchant ship Wanhsien. It came under fire from the Chinese troops on shore, and the gunboats  and Widgeon returned fire. Once the hostages from the Wahnsien and Wantung had escaped, the gunboats also shelled the merchant ships heavily so they would no longer be seaworthy in Chinese hands, and then the British ships retired. There were approximately 22 casualties on the British side, 250 dead on the Chinese side and 100 civilians killed in the crossfire. The altercation led to a major diplomatic row as the Chinese claimed that they had suffered thousands of casualties and that the British had shelled Wahnsien itself in violation of international law (the city was ablaze at four points). 
Rudolph Valentino's final film The Son of the Sheik went into general release.
In Spain, the officers of the Artillery Corps staged a collective protest by shutting themselves within their barracks. They were angry about the system that promoted officers by election rather than seniority. King Alfonso XIII declared martial law throughout the country and the officers were swiftly arrested. 
A timber barn being used as a temporary cinema in Dromcolliher, Ireland caught fire when a candle ignited a reel of film stock. 48 died in the tragedy.

Monday, September 6, 1926
Rudolph Valentino's funeral train arrived in Los Angeles. More than 3,000 onlookers filled the streets to watch the procession of the hearse to the Guardian Angel mortuary chapel.
The Kuomintang captured Hankou.
Born: Claus van Amsberg, Prince consort of the Netherlands, near Hitzacker, Germany (d. 2002); Maurice Cowling, historian, in London (d. 2005); Maurice Prather, photographer and film director, in Miami, Florida (d. 2001)

Tuesday, September 7, 1926
A second funeral Mass for Rudolph Valentino was held at the Catholic Church of the Good Shepherd in Beverly Hills, and then he was interred at the Hollywood Memorial Park Cemetery (now the Hollywood Forever cemetery) in Hollywood. Charlie Chaplin, George Fitzmaurice and Samuel Goldwyn were among the pallbearers.
Born: Don Messick, actor, in Buffalo, New York (d. 1997)

Wednesday, September 8, 1926
Germany was formally admitted to the League of Nations with a permanent seat on the council.
Born: Sergio Pininfarina, automobile designer, in Turin, Italy (d. 2012)

Thursday, September 9, 1926
About 1,000 Greek rebels, many still loyal to the deposed Greek dictator Theodoros Pangalos, attacked government troops in Athens. Many civilians were caught in the crossfire as government troops counter-attacked and the revolt was put down.

Friday, September 10, 1926
Norma Smallwood of Tulsa, Oklahoma, was crowned the sixth Miss America.

Saturday, September 11, 1926
Italian anarchist Gino Lucetti threw a bomb at Benito Mussolini as his limousine passed by the Porta Pia gate in Rome. Four were wounded, but Mussolini was unhurt and Lucetti was quickly captured.
Aloha Tower opened in Honolulu, Hawaii.

Sunday, September 12, 1926
The film Subway Sadie opened.

Monday, September 13, 1926
The Northern line extension opened on the London Tube; the 17 miles from Morden to East Finchley tube station made it the world's longest tunnel. 
The Murulla rail accident killed 26 people near Murrurundi, New South Wales, Australia.

Tuesday, September 14, 1926
The Liberal Party of Canada led by William Lyon Mackenzie King won a plurality of seats in the Canadian federal election. 
General Erich Ludendorff married Mathilde von Kemnitz in a small civil ceremony in Tutzing, Germany, attended only by a dozen officers who had joined him in the failed 1923 Beer Hall Putsch. It was his second marriage and her third.
Born: Dick Dale, singer and saxophone player, in Algona, Iowa (d. 2014)

Wednesday, September 15, 1926
Jelly Roll Morton and his Red Hot Peppers recorded "Black Bottom Stomp" in Chicago.
The new Rudyard Kipling collection Debits and Credits was published. One poem, "The Vineyard", drew controversy as it was interpreted as a criticism of the United States' late entry into World War I. One stanza read: "At the eleventh hour he came/But his wages were the same/As ours who all day long had trod/The winepress of the wrath of God."
Born: Jean-Pierre Serre, mathematician, in Bages, Pyrénées-Orientales, France (alive in 2021)
Died: Rudolf Christoph Eucken, 80, German writer and Nobel Prize laureate

Thursday, September 16, 1926
District Attorney of Los Angeles County Asa Keyes ordered the arrest of Aimee Semple McPherson, her mother, and three others on charges including "conspiracy to commit acts injurious to public morals."
The Italian and Romanian governments signed a Treaty of Friendship in which Italy offered Romania a large loan in return for oil and other concessions.
Shin-Etsu Chemical founded in Nagano City, Japan.
Born: John Knowles, author, in Fairmont, West Virginia (d. 2001); and Robert H. Schuller, televangelist and motivational speaker, in Alton, Iowa (d. 2015)

Friday, September 17, 1926
Film stars Mabel Normand and Lew Cody were married.
A great hurricane hit the Bahamas heading for Florida.
In the French border village of Thoiry, Foreign Ministers Aristide Briand of France and Gustav Stresemann of Germany held a conference to discuss various points of contention between the two countries. Tentative agreements were reached on the rest of the Rhineland and the Saar being returned to Germany in exchange for reparations payments, but no treaties resulted as the agreements were widely protested by the public, particularly in France.

Saturday, September 18, 1926
The Sherlock Holmes short story "The Adventure of the Three Gables" by Sir Arthur Conan Doyle was published for the first time in Liberty magazine in the United States.
A Category 4 hurricane struck Miami in the early morning hours. An estimated $100 million damage was done and many buildings in downtown Miami were destroyed.
Greece and Poland signed a Treaty of Friendship.

Sunday, September 19, 1926
Aimee Semple McPherson announced a legal defense fund for herself to "fight the devil" during a sermon at the Angelus Temple.
Born:
Victoria Barbă, Moldovan animated film director (d. 2020)
James Lipton, American television host and writer, in Detroit, Michigan (d. 2020)
Duke Snider, baseball player, in Los Angeles (d. 2011)

Monday, September 20, 1926
The Miami hurricane struck Pensacola, Florida, and completely destroyed almost every pier, warehouse and boat in Pensacola Bay.

The North Side Gang attempted to assassinate Al Capone, spraying his headquarters in Cicero, Illinois, with over a thousand rounds of machine gun fire in broad daylight as Capone was eating there. Capone escaped harm.

Tuesday, September 21, 1926
The Miami hurricane began to dissipate as it entered Louisiana. All told the hurricane killed at least 373 people, wounded over 6,000, and did the equivalent of about $90 billion damage in modern dollars.
Mushy Callahan defeated Pinky Mitchell in Vernon, California, to win the light welterweight boxing title.
Born: Donald A. Glaser, physicist and Nobel Prize laureate, in Cleveland, Ohio (d. 2013); and Noor Jehan, singer and actress, in Kasur, Punjab, British Raj (d. 2000)
Died: Léon Charles Thévenin, 59, French telegraph engineer

Wednesday, September 22, 1926

Thomas Edison declared the radio a commercial failure, saying, "There isn't 10 percent of the interest in radio that there was last year. It's a highly complicated machine in the hands of people who know nothing about it. No dealers have made any money out of it. It isn't a commercial machine, because it is complicated ... The phonograph is coming back into its own, because the people want good music."

Thursday, September 23, 1926

Gene Tunney defeated Jack Dempsey by unanimous decision to win the world heavyweight boxing championship in Philadelphia.
The United States negotiated an armistice in the Nicaraguan Civil War; President Emiliano Chamorro Vargas agreed to resign so the Nicaraguan Congress could select a new president.
Born: John Coltrane, jazz saxophonist, in Hamlet, North Carolina (d. 1967)

Friday, September 24, 1926
The St. Louis Cardinals clinched the National League pennant with a 6–4 win over the New York Giants.
The Pabst Mine Disaster occurred at the Pabst Iron Mine in Ironwood, Michigan. 3 miners were killed and 43 were trapped when an elevator fell down the shaft, which was then sealed by a rock fall.
The 5th Avenue Theatre opened in Seattle.
Born: Aubrey Burl, British archaeologist (d. 2020)

Saturday, September 25, 1926
The New York Yankees took a doubleheader from the St. Louis Browns by scores of 10–2 and 10–4 to clinch the American League pennant.
The National Hockey League officially added the Chicago Black Hawks, Detroit Cougars (now the Red Wings) and New York Rangers to the league as new teams for the 1926–27 season.
Henry Ford introduced the eight-hour day and five-day workweek.
The League of Nations Slavery Convention abolished all types of slavery.
Died: Herbert Booth, 74, third son of William and Catherine Booth

Sunday, September 26, 1926
 The town of Colonial Heights, Virginia is founded as part of Chesterfield County. Later becoming an independent city in 1948.
The film Paradise opened.
Born: Masatoshi Koshiba, physicist and Nobel Prize laureate, in Toyohashi, Japan (d. 2020); and Julie London, singer and actress, in Santa Rosa, California (d. 2000)

Monday, September 27, 1926
A preliminary hearing-for-trial began in the Aimee Semple McPherson case.

Tuesday, September 28, 1926
The Soviet–Lithuanian Non-Aggression Pact was signed, confirming all basic provisions of the Soviet–Lithuanian Peace Treaty of 1920.
More Mexicans began to revolt as Pénjamo, Guanajuato, mayor Luis Navarro Origel led an uprising.
Born: Jerry Clower, country comedian, in Liberty, Mississippi (d. 1998)

Wednesday, September 29, 1926
The 43 trapped miners in the Pabst Mine Disaster were rescued.
Rebellion broke out in Durango.
Born: Russ Heath, illustrator, in New York City (d. 2018)

Thursday, September 30, 1926
British Foreign Affairs Secretary Austen Chamberlain met with Benito Mussolini at the Tuscan port of Livorno. It was reported that the discussions were cordial and topics included the possibility of restoring the monarchy in Greece, Franco-German economic relations, and the administration of Tangier.  
Born: Robin Roberts, baseball player, in Springfield, Illinois (d. 2010)

References

1926
1926-09
1926-09